The 28th Golden Globe Awards, honoring the best in film and television for 1970, were held on February 5, 1971.

Winners and nominees

Film

{| class="wikitable" style="width=100%"
! colspan="2" |Best Motion Picture
|-
! style="width=50%" |Drama
! style="width=50%" |Comedy or Musical
|-
| valign="top" |
Love Story
Airport
Five Easy Pieces
I Never Sang for My Father
Patton
| valign="top" |
M*A*S*H
Darling Lili
Diary of a Mad Housewife
Lovers and Other Strangers
Scrooge
|-
! colspan="2" |Best Performance in a Motion Picture – Drama
|-
!Actor
!Actress
|-
| valign="top" |
George C. Scott – Patton as George S. Patton
Melvyn Douglas – I Never Sang for My Father as Tom Garrison
James Earl Jones – The Great White Hope as Jack Jefferson
Jack Nicholson – Five Easy Pieces as Robert Eroica Dupea
Ryan O'Neal – Love Story as Oliver Barret IV
| valign="top" |
Ali MacGraw – Love Story as Jennifer Cavalleri
Faye Dunaway – Puzzle of a Downfall Child as Lou Andreas Sand
Glenda Jackson – Women in Love as Gudrun Brangwen
Melina Mercouri – Promise at Dawn as Nina Kacew
Sarah Miles – Ryan's Daughter as Rosy Ryan
|-
! colspan="2" |Best Performance in a Motion Picture – Comedy or Musical
|-
!Actor
!Actress
|-
| valign="top" |
Albert Finney – Scrooge as Ebenezer Scrooge
Richard Benjamin – Diary of a Mad Housewife as Jonathan Balser
Elliott Gould – M*A*S*H as Captain John "Trapper" McIntyre
Jack Lemmon – The Out-of-Towners as George Kellerman
Donald Sutherland – M*A*S*H as Captain Benjamin "Hawkeye" Pierce
| valign="top" |
Carrie Snodgress – Diary of a Mad Housewife as Tina Balser
Julie Andrews – Darling Lili as Lili Smith
Sandy Dennis – The Out-of-Towners as Gwen Kellerman
Angela Lansbury – Something for Everyone as Countess Erthe Van Orstein
Barbra Streisand – The Owl and the Pussycat as Doris
|-
! colspan="2" |Best Supporting Performance in a Motion Picture – Drama, Comedy or Musical
|-
!Supporting Actor
!Supporting Actress
|-
| valign="top" |
John Mills – Ryan's Daughter as Michael
Chief Dan George – Little Big Man as Old Lodge Skins
Trevor Howard – Ryan's Daughter as Father Collins
George Kennedy – Airport as Joe Patroni
John Marley – Love Story as Phil Cavalleri
| valign="top" |
Karen Black – Five Easy Pieces as Rayette Dipesto
Maureen Stapleton – Airport as Inez Guerrero
Tina Chen – The Hawaiians as Nyuk Tsin
Lee Grant – The Landlord as Joyce Enders
Sally Kellerman – M*A*S*H as Margaret O'Houlihan
|-
! colspan=2 | Other
|-
!Best Director
!Best Screenplay
|-
| valign="top" |
Arthur Hiller – Love Story
Robert Altman – M*A*S*H
Bob Rafelson – Five Easy Pieces
Ken Russell – Women in Love
Franklin J. Schaffner – Patton
| valign="top" |
Love Story – Erich Segal	
Five Easy Pieces – Carole Eastman and Bob Rafelson
Husbands – John Cassavetes
M*A*S*H – Ring Lardner, Jr.
Scrooge – Leslie Bricusse
|-
!Best Original Score
!Best Original Song
|-
| valign="top" |Love Story – Francis LaiAirport – Alfred Newman
Cromwell – Frank Cordell
Scrooge – Leslie Bricusse, Ian Fraser and Herbert W. Spencer
Wuthering Heights – Michel Legrand
| valign="top" | "Whistling Away the Dark" (Henry Mancini, Johnny Mercer) – Darling Lili
"Ballad of Little Fauss and Big Halsy" (Carl Perkins, Johnny Cash) – Little Fauss and Big Halsy
"Pieces of Dreams" (Michel Legrand, Alan and Marilyn Bergman) – Pieces of Dreams
"Thank You Very Much" (Leslie Bricusse) – Scrooge
"Till Love Touches Your Life" (Riz Ortolani, Arthur Hamilton) – Madron
|-
!Best Foreign Film (English Language)
!Best Foreign Film (Foreign Language)
|-
| valign="top" |
Women in Love (United Kingdom)The Act of the Heart (Canada)
Bloomfield (United Kingdom/Israel)
One Soldier's Gamble (Japan)
The Virgin and the Gypsy (United Kingdom)
| valign="top" | Rider on the Rain (France)Borsalino (France/Italy)
The Confession (France)
Customer of the Off Season (France/Israel)
Investigation of a Citizen Above Suspicion (Italy)
|-
!New Star of the Year – Actor
!New Star of the Year – Actress
|-
| valign="top" |James Earl Jones – The Great White Hope as Jack JeffersonAssaf Dayan – Promise at Dawn as Romain (age 25)
Frank Langella – Diary of a Mad Housewife as George Prager
Joe Namath – Norwood as Joe
Kenneth Nelson – The Boys in the Band as Michael
| valign="top" |Carrie Snodgress – Diary of a Mad Housewife as Tina BalserJane Alexander – The Great White Hope as Eleanor Bachman
Anna Calder-Marshall – Pussycat, Pussycat, I Love You as Millie
Marlo Thomas – Jenny as Jenny
Angel Tompkins – I Love My Wife as Helene Donnelly
|}

Television

Best Show – Drama Medical Center
The Bold Ones: The Senator
Marcus Welby, M.D.
The Mod Squad
The Young Lawyers

Best Show – Comedy or Musical
 The Carol Burnett Show
The Courtship of Eddie's Father
Family Affair
The Glen Campbell Goodtime Hour
The Partridge Family

Best Actor – Drama Series
 Peter Graves – Mission: Impossible
Mike Connors – Mannix
Chad Everett – Medical Center
Burt Reynolds – Dan August
Robert Young – Marcus Welby, M.D.

Best Actress – Drama Series
 Peggy Lipton – The Mod Squad
Amanda Blake – Gunsmoke
Linda Cristal – The High Chaparral
Yvette Mimieux – The Most Deadly Game
Denise Nicholas – Room 222

Best Actor – Comedy or Musical Series
 Flip Wilson – The Flip Wilson Show
Herschel Bernardi – Arnie
David Frost – The David Frost Show
Merv Griffin – The Merv Griffin Show
Danny Thomas – Make Room for Granddaddy

Best Actress – Comedy or Musical Series
 Mary Tyler Moore – The Mary Tyler Moore Show
Carol Burnett – The Carol Burnett Show
Shirley Jones – The Partridge Family
Juliet Mills – Nanny and the Professor
Elizabeth Montgomery – Bewitched

Best Supporting Actor
 James Brolin – Marcus Welby, M.D.
Tige Andrews – The Mod Squad
Michael Constantine – Room 222
Henry Gibson – Rowan & Martin's Laugh-In
Zalman King – The Young Lawyers

Best Supporting Actress
 Gail Fisher – Mannix
Sue Ane Langdon – Arnie
Miyoshi Umeki – The Courtship of Eddie's Father
Karen Valentine – Room 222
Lesley Ann Warren – Mission: Impossible

References
IMdb 1971 Golden Globe Awards

028
1970 film awards
1970 television awards
February 1971 events in the United States
1970 awards in the United States